Joanna Katarzyna Skrzydlewska (born 17 February 1977 in Łódź) is a Polish politician. She was elected to the Sejm on 25 September 2005, getting 11,822 votes in 9 Łódź district as a candidate from the Civic Platform list.

She is a member of the Skrzydlewski family that own the Lodz's largest florist and funeral home chains. Her father, Witold Skrzydlewski, was the subject of a documentary called Skin Hunters, where he was one of two funeral home operators accused of paying for information from paramedics so as to profit from patients' deaths. The other funeral home owner has been convicted and an investigation is ongoing regarding her father's involvement, if any.

See also
Members of Polish Sejm 2005-2007

External links
Own website

1977 births
Living people
Members of the Polish Sejm 2005–2007
Civic Platform politicians
Civic Platform MEPs
MEPs for Poland 2009–2014
Women MEPs for Poland
Women members of the Sejm of the Republic of Poland
University of Łódź alumni
Members of the Polish Sejm 2007–2011